The Tyne Tees Tigers are an Australian rules football club in North East England, England.

The Tigers were founded in April 2012 from the remnants of the North East England league, which formerly comprised the Durham Saints, Gateshead Miners, Hartlepool Dockers, Middlesbrough Hawks, Newcastle Centurions and the Redcar Bombers.
 
The 2012 and 2013 seasons saw the Tigers playing as a social team in friendly matches and tournaments in and in 2014 the Tigers played their first competitive season having been voted in as a full member team of the AFLCNE.

In 2016 the Tigers found a new home in Gosforth Sports Association and triumphed against Merseyside Saints and Sheffield Thunder in the AFLCNE Plate competition to take their first League silverware. In 2017 the Tigers repeated this feat with a one sided victory over Merseyside Saints.

From 2018 the Tigers will be playing in the SARFL

Notable past players include Chris "Crafty" Medcraft, Tom Lally and Josh Tambakis

References

Australian rules football clubs established in 2012
2012 establishments in England